Torre de Santa María is a municipality located in the province of Cáceres and autonomous community of Extremadura, Spain.

References

Municipalities in the Province of Cáceres